Charles F. Goldfarb is known as the father of Standard Generalized Markup Language (SGML) and grandfather of HTML and the World Wide Web. He co-invented the concept of markup languages.

In 1969 Charles Goldfarb, leading a small team at IBM, developed the first markup language, called Generalized Markup Language, or GML. Goldfarb coined the term GML, an initialism for the three researchers, Charles Goldfarb, Ed Mosher and Ray Lorie who worked on the project.

In 1974, he designed SGML and subsequently wrote the first SGML parser, ARCSGML. Goldfarb went on working to turn SGML into the ISO 8879 standard, and served as its editor in the standardization committee.

Goldfarb holds a J.D. from Harvard Law School. He worked at IBM's Almaden Research Center for many years and is now an independent consultant based in Belmont, California.

Selected publications
The SGML Handbook, Oxford University Press (1991), 
SGML Buyer's Guide, Prentice Hall (1998), 
XML Handbook, Prentice Hall (1998),

References

External links
Charles F. Goldfarb's SGML Homepage
A Conversation with Charles F. Goldfarb
XML Opportunities Knocking (Interview Part 2)

Harvard Law School alumni
IBM employees
Markup languages
Living people
Year of birth missing (living people)
People from Belmont, California